Copelatus sylvaticus is a species of diving beetle. It is part of the subfamily Copelatinae in the family Dytiscidae. It was described by Félix Guignot in 1952.

References

sylvaticus
Beetles described in 1952